Breakingviews is Reuters' brand for financial commentary. The company was founded in 1999 as Breakingviews.com and was acquired by Thomson Reuters in 2009.

History 

Breakingviews was founded in 1999 by Hugo Dixon, a former editor of the Financial Times' Lex column, and his colleague Jonathan Ford. It launched its website in July 2000. In 2001, the site became the first online business journal to win a Harold Wincott award, and its columnists have won numerous awards since then.

In 2005, the site launched a United States edition, led by founding editor Rob Cox. On January 1, 2007 the Wall Street Journal syndicated the service for a daily column on the back page of the "Money and Investing" section and WSJ.com. After Rupert Murdoch's News Corp bought Dow Jones, the parent of the Journal, the Breakingviews newspaper column moved to the New York Times and the International Herald Tribune (now the International New York Times), and to the Daily Telegraph in the U.K.

Thomson Reuters bought the company in 2009 for about $20 million, according to news reports at the time.

Reuters announced in October 2012 that Dixon would step down as global editor-in-chief of Breakingviews, to be succeeded by Rob Cox.

Partnerships 

In addition to Breakingviews columns carried in major news publications around the world, they have appeared in Fortune magazine, Slate.com, Económico (Portugal), Le Monde (France), Handelsblatt (Germany), NRC Handelsblad (Netherlands), Caijing (China), The Business Times (Singapore), The National (United Arab Emirates), Kauppalehti (Finland), El Pais and Cinco Dias (Spain), l'Agefi (Switzerland), La Stampa (Italy), Business Standard (India) and other leading print and online outlets.

External links 
 Breakingviews

References 

Thomson Reuters
Financial services companies established in 1999
Canadian news websites
2009 mergers and acquisitions
1999 establishments in Canada